Crank It Up may refer to:

 "Crank It Up" (David Guetta song), 2011
 "Crank It Up" (Hadouken! song), 2008
 "Crank It Up" (Ashley Tisdale song), 2009
 "Crank It Up", a song by David Banner
 "Crank It Up", a song by Peter Brown
 "Crank It Up", a song on Scooter's album Our Happy Hardcore